Gianfranco Faina was an Italian professor. His early experiences were first in the communist party, following his departure from which he participated in many political groups such as the "workers-students league" where the separation between workers and intellectuals was eliminated. He had a pivotal role in the creation of Italian Operaism Movements.

Faina taught History at the University of Genoa when the city was the center of the July 1960 uprising. He did political work with Classe Operaia (Working Class Party) for a time before doing political work with 'working class autonomy' and anarchist groups during the 1970s. In this part of his life, the Azione Rivoluzionaria group was created. He also supported the group "XXII Ottobre" acting in Genova.

On November the 9th, 1977, an arrest warrant was issued against Faina by the Milan Judiciary for his alleged involvement with the left-wing group Azione Rivoluzionaria. After briefly absconding, Faina was subsequently apprehended and jailed in La Spezia prison, where he later died of cancer on February 11, 1981.

References 

 Memoir published in Primo Maggio, no. 19/20, Winter 1983/84 by Rinaldo Manstretta and Pierpaolo Poggio

1981 deaths
20th-century Italian historians
Academic staff of the University of Genoa
Year of birth missing